{{safesubst:#invoke:RfD|||month = March
|day = 16
|year = 2023
|time = 19:29
|timestamp = 20230316192918

|content=
REDIRECT Orthodoxy#Christianity

}}